Rhapsody of Happiness is a Chinese film directed by Chen Liting and written by Chen Baichen. Made during the Republican era, it was produced by the state-owned China Film No. 2 Studio based in Shanghai. The film was released in late 1947, following the success of Chen Liting's first film Far Away Love.

Film and plot
Huang Zongying played a woman forced into prostitution and drug dealing in war-torn China, capturing both the degeneracy and the kindness of the character's complex nature. The male lead was her future husband Zhao Dan, China's most celebrated male actor of the time.

Cast 
Zhao Dan
Huang Zongying
Gu Eryi
Zhang Yi

See also
List of Chinese films of the 1940s

References

Bibliography

1947 films
Films directed by Chen Liting
1940s Mandarin-language films
1947 drama films
Chinese black-and-white films
Chinese drama films